4.0 may refer to:

 4 (disambiguation)
 4.0 (Mónica Naranjo album), a 2014 compilation album by Spanish recording singer-songwriter Mónica Naranjo
 LP Underground 4.0, a 2004 CD and digital download set by Linkin Park Underground
 Live Free or Die Hard, a 2007 American action thriller film (released as Die Hard 4.0 outside North America)

See also
 Industry 4.0